The women's discus throw event at the 1999 European Athletics U23 Championships was held in Göteborg, Sweden, at Ullevi on 29 July 1999.

Medalists

Results

Final
29 July

Qualifications
29 July
First 12 to the Final

Participation
According to an unofficial count, 16 athletes from 10 countries participated in the event.

 (1)
 (3)
 (3)
 (1)
 (2)
 (1)
 (2)
 (1)
 (1)
 (1)

References

Discus throw
Discus throw at the European Athletics U23 Championships